Kalateh-ye Ahmadi (also Romanized as Kalāteh-ye Aḩmadī; also known as Kalāteh-ye Pazī) is a village in Pain Velayat Rural District, in the Central District of Kashmar County, Razavi Khorasan Province, Iran. At the 2006 census, its population was 112, in 28 families.

References 

Populated places in Kashmar County